Jiří Pernes (born 4 July 1948 in Svitavy) is a Czech historian.

From 1984 to 1990, he was the director of the Historical Museum in Slavkov u Brna (Austerlitz), and from 1990 to 1992, he was director of the Moravské zemské muzeum in Brno. In 2011, he directed the Institute for the Study of Totalitarian Regimes. Jiří Pernes held lectures at Masaryk University in Brno and at Jan Evangelista Purkyně University in Ústí nad Labem.

He now works in the Institute for Contemporary History at the Czech Academy of Science in Brno. He wrote many books and papers about Moravian, Czech and Czechoslovak history in the 19th and 20th centuries.

In 2010, he was dismissed from his position as director of the Institute for the Study of Totalitarian Regimes after allegations that he had plagiarized large portions of his 1997 book about Emanuel Moravec from another person's doctoral dissertation. Pernes said that he had never knowingly copied the work of others.

References

Selected works 
 Spiklenci proti Jeho Veličenstvu aneb Historie tzv. spiknutí Omladiny v Čechách, Praha 1988
 Život plný nepřátel aneb Život a smrt Františka Ferdinanda d'Este, Praha 1995
 Habsburkové bez trůnu, Praha 1995
 Pod moravskou orlicí aneb Dějiny moravanství, Brno 1996
 Maxmilián I. Mexický císař z rodu Habsburků, Praha 1997
 Až na dno zrady. Emanuel Moravec, Praha 1997
 Pod Habsburským orlem. České země a Rakousko-Uhersko na přelomu 19. a 20. století, Praha 2001, 2006
 Takoví nám vládli. Komunističtí prezidenti Československa a doba, v níž žili, Praha 2003
 František Josef I. Nikdy nekorunovaný český král, Praha 2005
 Komunistky. S fanatismem v srdci, Praha 2006
 Krize komunistického režimu v Československu v 50. letech 20. století, Brno 2008

1948 births
Living people
20th-century Czech historians
Masaryk University alumni
Academic staff of Jan Evangelista Purkyně University in Ústí nad Labem
People from Svitavy
Historians of the Czech lands
21st-century Czech historians